KCTE (1510 AM) is a daytime sports radio station, broadcasting from two towers in Independence, Missouri.  In 1994, KCTE became the Kansas City metropolitan area's first station devoted to sports. Today, it is secondary to sister station, Sportsradio WHB.

History
Debuting in 1947 as KIMO, the middle of the road daytimer was acquired in 1962 by Richard Bott and became the first of many Christian programming stations in his Bott Radio Network.  KCCV (Kansas City's Christian Voice) broadcast at 1510 AM until 1990, when Bott moved to a new frequency licensed for 24-hour broadcasting.  1510 became home to rhythm and blues oldies and later adult standards.

In 1994, new owners acquired the station and debuted KCTE (Spelling KC-Team), Kansas City's first sports talk station.  Throughout the 1990s, KCTE grew in popularity, yet was constrained by the daytime-only operation. With the aid of Union Bank president Jerry Green, KCTE purchased the 50,000-watt WHB and moved its sports operations onto the 810 frequency on October 1, 1999.

After stints as a Hispanic and an alternative rock station (playing a repeating two-hour tape loop), the Hot Talk format debuted in 2001. KCTE's programming previously included Don Imus's morning show, Dennis Miller's talk show, and local shows hosted by personalities from KMBC-TV. The station also carried a large portion of ESPN Radio programming until it moved to sister station KCXM in January 2007. The current lineup includes programming from ESPN Radio, CBS Sports Radio, the Jim Rome Show, and some local programming. To improve station coverage, KCTE now simulcasts on translator 94.5 K233DM.

Because KCTE shares the same frequency as "clear channel" station WLAC in Nashville, Tennessee; it broadcasts only during the daytime hours.

External links
KCTE's Web site

CTE
Independence, Missouri
Talk radio stations in the United States
Sports radio stations in the United States
Radio stations established in 1947
Companies based in Independence, Missouri
1947 establishments in Missouri
CTE